Governor Gore may refer to:

Christopher Gore (1758–1827), 8th Governor of Massachusetts
Francis Gore (1769–1852), Governor of Bermuda from 1805 to 1806
Howard Mason Gore (1877–1947), 17th Governor of West Virginia
Robert Hayes Gore (1886–1972), Governor of Puerto Rico from 1933 to 1934